Tomáš Kučera (born 20 July 1991) is a Czech football midfielder. He currently plays for Teplice.

References

External links

1991 births
Living people
Czech footballers
Association football midfielders
Czech First League players
FC Vysočina Jihlava players
FC Hradec Králové players
FK Teplice players
FC Viktoria Plzeň players
Sportspeople from Havlíčkův Brod
Czech rappers